Arthur Gordon "Paddy" Roberts (born 21 November 1929) is a British former professional tennis player. He is the son of tennis coach Arthur Roberts Sr, who guided Sue Barker and Angela Mortimer to grand slam titles.

Roberts, native of Torquay, was British junior champion in 1946 and 1947. As an 18-year old in 1948 he had an upset win over France's number five ranked player Roger Duboc at the British Hard Court Championships. He progressed to win titles at Cheltenham and Exmouth amongst others over the next few years. In 1951 he featured for the Great Britain Davis Cup team in a tie against France and lost his reverse singles match to Bernard Destremau in five sets. Later in the year he had a close loss to Eric Sturgess in the final of the Scottish Championships. In 1952 he opted to turn professional. He was a two-time winner of the British Professional Championships.

See also
List of Great Britain Davis Cup team representatives

References

External links
 
 
 

1929 births
Possibly living people
British male tennis players
English male tennis players
Tennis people from Devon
Sportspeople from Torquay